Cranford is a civil parish in Northamptonshire, England. The two settlements in the parish are:
 Cranford St Andrew
 Cranford St John

At the time of the 2001 census, the parish population was 414 people, increasing to 422 at the 2011 census.

References

Civil parishes in Northamptonshire
North Northamptonshire